Aín (Spanish: Ahín) is a town in eastern Spain, in the province of Castellón, part of the autonomous community of Valencia.

It is  home to a 13th-century castle.

References

Municipalities in the Province of Castellón
Plana Baixa